The Maryland Symphony Orchestra is an American professional orchestra based in Hagerstown, Maryland.

History 
The orchestra was founded in 1982, and Barry Tuckwell was the artistic director until the 1997-1998 season. The current music director, Elizabeth Schulze, formerly associate conductor of the National Symphony Orchestra, got the position in the 1999-2000 season.

Events 
Beginning with five classical concerts in its first season, the programming of the orchestra now includes different events such as the "Masterworks series"; "MSO Pops!"; "Home for the Holidays"; "Salute to Independence", a concert at Antietam National Battlefield; "Citi Youth Concerts" and "Kinder Konzerts", directed to children. The orchestra also occasionally performs in Frostburg and Frederick, although its main concert hall is the Maryland Theatre. Members of the MSO give numerous ensemble performances for Washington County elementary and middle school students as part of its education outreach program, in addition to performing for residents of area and retirement centers.

Since its founding, the orchestra's annual audience has grown from 4,500 to 70,000, while its operating budget has increased from $100,000 to just over $1.3 million. The orchestra has also performed world premieres of five compositions, two of which were commissioned.

References
Maryland Symphony Orchestra
The Maryland Theatre Web Site

Musical groups established in 1982
Orchestras based in Maryland
Hagerstown, Maryland
Washington County, Maryland
Wikipedia requested audio of orchestras
1982 establishments in Maryland